2017 Japan – East Asia Network of Exchange for Students and Youths (JENESYS) Japan-ASEAN U-16 Youth Football Tournament was the second edition of the football tournament event promoted by Ministry of Foreign Affairs of Japan as part of the Japan Football Association's commitment to support the JENESYS exchange program. The tournament took place from 8 March until 12 March 2018.

Indonesia earned the champion title after beating Vietnam 1–0 in the final.

Qualified teams 
There was no qualification and all entrants advanced to the final tournament. The following 10 teams from member associations of the ASEAN Football Federation and 2 teams from Japan entered the tournament.

Regulation 
The rules were as follows.
 Matches consist of two halves and each half is 40 minutes long
 Each team will consist with male players under the age of 16
 12 teams will be divided in 4 groups of 3 teams
 Round robin group stage followed by play-offs to decide rankings
 Each teams may select up to 18 players and 6 officials

Group stage 
 All matches played in Miyazaki Prefecture, Japan
 Times listed are local (UTC+9:00)

Group A

Group B

Group C

Group D

Group stage second-place playoff

Fifth/sixth place playoff

Seventh/eighth place playoff

Group stage third-place playoff

Ninth/tenth place playoff

Eleventh/twelfth place playoff

Knockout phase

Semifinal

Third place playoff

Final

Statistics

Winner

Tournament teams ranking
This table will show the ranking of teams throughout the tournament.

References 

International association football competitions hosted by Japan
March 2018 sports events in Japan
2018 in Japanese football